General Davis may refer to:

Benjamin O. Davis Jr. (1912–2002), U.S. Air Force general
Benjamin O. Davis Sr. (1877–1970), U.S. Army brigadier general
Bennie L. Davis (1928–2012), U.S. Air Force general
Dickie Davis (British Army officer) (born 1962), British Army major general
Ed Davis (Royal Marines officer) (born 1963), Royal Marines lieutenant general
Edmund J. Davis (1827–1883), Union Army brigadier general
Franklin M. Davis Jr. (1918–1980), U.S. Army major general
George R. Davis (New York politician) (1788–1867), New York State Militia general
George B. Davis (1847–1914), U.S. Army major general
George Whitefield Davis (1839–1918), U.S. Army major general
Gronow Davis (1828–1891), British Army major general
James B. Davis (general) (born 1935), U.S. Air Force general
Jefferson C. Davis (1828–1879), Union Army brevet major general
Jefferson Davis (1808–1889), Army of Mississippi major general
John Davis (British Army officer) (1832–1901), British Army major general
John Davis (Pennsylvania politician) (1788–1878), U.S. major general of militia
John J. Davis (general) (1909–1997), U.S. Army lieutenant general
John K. Davis (1927–2019), U.S. Marine Corps four-star general
Jon M. Davis (fl. 1980s–2010s), U.S. Marine Corps lieutenant general
Joseph R. Davis (1825–1896), Confederate States Army brigadier general and Mississippi National Guard major general
Leighton I. Davis (1910–1995), U.S. Air Force lieutenant general
Nelson H. Davis (1821–1890), U.S. Army brigadier general
Raymond G. Davis (1915–2003), U.S. Marine Corps four-star-general
Reuben Davis (representative) (1813–1890), Confederate States Army brigadier general
Robert Courtney Davis (1876–1944), U.S. Army major general
Russell C. Davis (general) (born 1938), U.S. Air Force lieutenant general
Stephen L. Davis (fl. 1980s–2020s), U.S. Air Force major general 
Thomas Francis Davis (1853–1935), U.S. Army brigadier general
Thomas Jefferson Davis (1893–1964), U.S. Army brigadier general
William Church Davis (1866–1958), U.S. Army brigadier general and major general (retirement list)
William G. M. Davis (1812–1898), Confederate States Army brigadier general

See also
General Davies (disambiguation)
Attorney General Davis (disambiguation)